HMCS Bras d'Or is a name used by the Royal Canadian Navy and Canadian Forces MARCOM for several ships, named after Bras d'Or Lake.

 , auxiliary minesweeper (1939–1940)
 , experimental hydrofoil (1957–1962)
 , prototype hydrofoil (1968–1971)

Royal Canadian Navy ship names